OVR may refer to:

 .OVR (file extension), a file extension used with overlay managers
 Ottawa Valley Railway